was a Japanese botanist and educationalist (1867 - 1935).

He is the author of important studies about seaweeds. He's also well known for his educational books collection, the Ohraimono.

Bibliography 

 - published between 1907 and 1937, Japanese text with English summary. Total 10 volumes were bound to seven. Reprint in 2016.

References 
 Short biography

1867 births
1935 deaths
20th-century Japanese botanists
19th-century Japanese botanists